Tala Mi Daw (also တလမေဒေါ;  1368 – 1390) was the first wife of King Razadarit of Hanthawaddy. She was a half-sister of Razadarit and a daughter of King Binnya U by queen Sanda Dewi.

In late 1382, Daw eloped with her half-brother Binnya Nwe (Razadarit). They were soon caught. Because of the intervention of their aunt Princess Maha Dewi, the king relented and allowed the couple to be married. But soon after in May 1383, Nwe fled to Dagon (Yangon) to raise a rebellion. Binnya U died during the rebellion.

They had a son named Bawlawkyantaw. However King Razadarit's decision to keep the one-time flower seller Piya Yaza Dewi as his chief queen consort, led Tala Mi Daw to despair.

Razadarit grew tired of Tala Mi Daw and cast her aside, taking away all the jewels bestowed upon her by their father Binnya U. Heartbroken, Daw committed suicide in 1390.

Following her death, Razadarit ordered also the execution of their son. This was for fear Bawlawkyantaw may seek revenge from his father when he got older. Bawlawkyantaw was sworn to a terrible oath prior to execution. an oath that haunted his father King Razadarit.

References

Bibliography
 
 
 
 
 

Queens consort of Hanthawaddy
Burmese people of Mon descent
Suicides by poison